Peter Mikhailovich Kaptzevich or Kapcević or Kapzewitch (1772 – 3 July 1840) was a General who led a Russian infantry corps during the 1814 Campaign in France. In 1812 he led the 7th Division at Smolensk, Borodino, Maloyaroslavets and Krasnoi. Promoted to command the 10th Infantry Corps, he fought at the Katzbach and Leipzig in 1813 and Vauchamps, Gué-à-Tresmes, Laon and Paris in 1814. He was governor of Western Siberia in 1822–1827 and the following year he led a corps of Siberian militia. He is buried at the church in Nikolskoye, Sakmarsky District, Orenburg Oblast.

See also
 Nikolay Vuich
 Ivan Shevich
 Andrei Miloradovich
 Avram Ratkov
 Ivan Adamovich
 Nikolay Bogdanov
 Ilya Duka
 Mikhail Miloradovich
 Peter Ivelich
 Georgi Emmanuel
 Jovan Albanez
 Simeon Piščević
 Anto Gvozdenović
 Semyon Zorich
 Peter Tekeli
 Fedor Yakovlevich Mirkovich
 Marko Ivelich
 Rajko Depreradović
 Andrei Miloradovich
 Dejan Subotić

References

Further reading

Imperial Russian Army generals
People from the Russian Empire of Serbian descent
Russian people of Serbian descent
Russian commanders of the Napoleonic Wars
Recipients of the Order of St. George of the Second Degree
Recipients of the Order of St. George of the Third Degree
1772 births
1840 deaths